Teri MacDonald-Cadieux (born November 8, 1963) is a Canadian stock car racing driver. Sister of NASCAR Winston Cup Series driver Randy MacDonald, she is currently retired from competition; she has competed in the past in NASCAR Craftsman Truck Series and CASCAR competition.

Early career
Born in Whitby, Ontario on November 8, 1963, during the 1990s MacDonald was a member of the PPG Pace Car Team, a group of professional drivers who drove the pace car at IndyCar events. She also drove in competition in sports cars, including the IMSA series. An accident at Road Atlanta in 1997 nearly ended her career; MacDonald suffered a broken neck, and she was forced to wear a halo to stabilise her head and neck.

Following her recovery, MacDonald returned to sports car racing; in 2000, she moved to stock cars, competing in the American Speed Association's National Tour before joining the CASCAR Super Series, Canada's top stock car series, for the 2001 season. She finished 14th in points, scoring two top 10 finishes over the course of the year.

NASCAR
MacDonald made her debut in NASCAR's national touring series in 2002, in the Craftsman Truck Series at Memphis Motorsports Park. Randy MacDonald also competed in the race, making the siblings the first brother-sister combination to compete against each other in a top-level NASCAR race since Tim Flock and Ethel Flock Mobley in 1949.

MacDonald ran in three other races during the 2002 season; her best finish was 29th at Memphis. In 2003, she ran for Rookie of the Year in the Craftsman Truck Series; however she would only compete in one event that year, at Darlington Raceway, finishing 30th.

MacDonald returned to the Truck Series for two races in 2004; at Mansfield Motorsports Speedway, MacDonald, Tina Gordon and Kelly Sutton competed in the UAW/GM Ohio 250, the first time three female drivers raced in the same NASCAR event. She finished 25th in the event, her best finish of the year; a 32nd-place finish at Memphis was her final NASCAR event.

Personal life
MacDonald currently works as a Christian inspirational speaker. She is married to Charles Cadieux; they have one son.

Motorsports career results

NASCAR
(key) (Bold – Pole position awarded by qualifying time. Italics – Pole position earned by points standings or practice time. * – Most laps led.)

Craftsman Truck Series

References

External links
 
 Teri MacDonald-Cadieux at Driver Database

Living people
1963 births
Sportspeople from Whitby, Ontario
Racing drivers from Ontario
NASCAR drivers
IMSA GT Championship drivers
Champ Car drivers
American Speed Association drivers
Canadian female racing drivers